Mark Hermanus Maria Veens (born 26 June 1978 in Venray, Limburg) is a freestyle swimmer from the Netherlands, who competed for his native country at three consequentive Summer Olympics, starting in 1996 in Atlanta, Georgia as a member of the 4×100 m freestyle (fifth place).

Veens' finest hour came at the 1998 European Short Course Swimming Championships in Sheffield, where he ended up in second place in the 50 m freestyle. Half a year later, at the 1997 FINA World Swimming Championships (25 m) in Hong Kong, he won the bronze medal in the 50 m freestyle.

See also 
 Dutch records in swimming

References

Profile on Zwemkroniek
 Dutch Olympic Committee

1978 births
Living people
Dutch male freestyle swimmers
Swimmers at the 1996 Summer Olympics
Swimmers at the 2000 Summer Olympics
Swimmers at the 2004 Summer Olympics
Olympic silver medalists for the Netherlands
Olympic swimmers of the Netherlands
People from Venray
World Aquatics Championships medalists in swimming
Medalists at the FINA World Swimming Championships (25 m)
European Aquatics Championships medalists in swimming
Medalists at the 2004 Summer Olympics
Olympic silver medalists in swimming
Sportspeople from Limburg (Netherlands)
21st-century Dutch people